DNF or Dandified YUM is the next-generation version of the Yellowdog Updater, Modified (yum), a package manager for .rpm-based Linux distributions. DNF was introduced in Fedora 18 in 2013, it has been the default package manager since Fedora 22 in 2015, Red Hat Enterprise Linux 8., and OpenMandriva; and also an alternative package manager for Mageia.

Perceived deficiencies of yum (which DNF is intended to address) include poor performance, high memory usage, and the slowness of its iterative dependency resolution. DNF uses libsolv, an external dependency resolver.

DNF performs package management tasks on top of RPM, and supporting libraries.

DNF was originally written in Python, but  efforts are under way to port it to C and move most functionality from Python code into the new libdnf library. libdnf is already used by PackageKit, a Linux distribution-agnostic package system abstraction library, even though the library does not have most of DNF's features.

Adoption
DNF has been the default command-line package manager for Fedora since version 22, which was released in May 2015. The libdnf library is used as a package backend in PackageKit, which offers a graphical user interface (GUI). Later dnfdragora was developed for Fedora 27 as another alternative graphical front-end of DNF. DNF has also been available as an alternate package manager for Mageia Linux since version 6 and may become the default sometime in the future.

It is also the default package manager for RedHat Enterprise Linux, and by extension, Rocky Linux.

Dependencies

libdnf
 high-level API for DNF and underlying libraries
 C, C++
 LGPLv2+

libsolv
 a free package dependency solver using a satisfiability algorithm for solving packages and reading repositories
 C
 New BSD License

librepo
 a library providing C and Python (libcURL like) API for downloading Linux repository metadata and packages
 C
 LGPLv2+

libcomps
 libcomps is an alternative for yum.comps library, written in pure C, and has bindings for Python
 C
 GPLv2+

References

External links

 

Fedora Project
Linux package management-related software
Red Hat software